SS Valdivia was a passenger ship that was built in England and launched in 1886 as Tijuca. She was renamed Valdivia in 1896, Tom G Corpi in 1908 and Flandre in 1909. She had a succession of German owners until 1909, when she was bought by a French shipping company. She was scrapped in 1927.

Valdivia is notable as the ship in which the German marine biologist Carl Chun undertook the Valdivia Expedition in 1898–99.

Building
Armstrong, Mitchell & Co built Tijuca in its shipyard at Low Walker as yard number 496 for Hamburg Südamerikanische DG. She was launched in 28 August 1886 and completed that October.

The Wallsend Slipway & Engineering Company built her three-cylinder triple-expansion engine, which was rated at 265 NHP.

Throughout her German ownership, the ship was registered in Hamburg.

Changes of ownership and name
In 1896 Hamburg America Line bought Tijuca and renamed her Valdivia, after the Chilean city of Valdivia, which had a German emigré community.

In 1908 Peter R Hinsch of Hamburg bought Valdivia and renamed her Tom G Corpi. In 1909 the Société Générale de Transports Maritimes à Vapeur bought Tom G Corpi and renamed her Flandre. She was registered in Marseille and her French code letters were JGMW.

In January 1927 Flandre was scrapped at La Seyne-sur-Mer.

References

1886 ships
Passenger ships of Germany
Ships built by Armstrong Whitworth
Steamships of France
Steamships of Germany
World War I passenger ships of France